Grey Nuns Hospital may refer to one of several hospitals established by the Grey Nuns in Canada, including:
 Grey Nuns Community Hospital, an acute care hospital in Edmonton, Alberta, Canada
 Grey Nuns Hospital (now Pasqua Hospital), a hospital in Regina, Saskatchewan, Canada
 Grey Nuns' Hospital, a hospital that operated from 1695 to 1880 in Montreal, Quebec, Canada